Tiny Hawks was an American hardcore punk rock duo from Providence, Rhode Island, United States, composed of Art Middleton (guitar) and Gus Martin (drums, double bass).

History
The band formed early in 2003 and played their first show in The Bakery warehouse in Olneyville, Rhode Island in May of that year. Tiny Hawks released their debut 8 song EP/12" Fingers Become Bridges in 2005 on Corleone Records and Moganono Records.  Their subsequent full-length People Without End was released in 2006. They disbanded when Gus started have medical issues that limited his drumming.

Tiny Hawks' musical style combines elements of math rock and noise rock as well as DC-influenced hardcore punk (Rites of Spring, Cap'n Jazz, Assfactor 4) and 1990s thrash (Palatka, In/Humanity). Their contemporaries include Sinaloa, Fiya, Daniel Striped Tiger, Ampere, Halo Perfecto, and Death to Tyrants. In 2005 and 2006, the duo performed at North East Sticks Together.

Members
 Art Middleton - guitar, vocals
 Gus Martin - drums, vocals, bass

Discography

External links
 Tiny Hawks official website
 corleone records

Hardcore punk groups from Rhode Island